Eugene Francis Augusterfer (October 4, 1913 – January 15, 1957) was an American football player and coach. He played professionally as a fullback and defensive back for the Pittsburgh Pirates of the National Football League (NFL) in 1935. Augusterfer served as head football coach at Arkansas Agricultural and Mechanical College—now known as the University of Arkansas at Monticello—from 1943 to 1944 and at his alma mater, Catholic University, in 1947. Augusterfer died on January 15, 1957, following a year-long illness. He was buried at Arlington National Cemetery.

Head coaching record

Football

References

External links
 

1913 births
1957 deaths
American football fullbacks
American football defensive backs
Arkansas–Monticello Boll Weevils football coaches
Basketball coaches from Washington, D.C.
Catholic University Cardinals football coaches
Catholic University Cardinals football players
Catholic University Cardinals men's basketball coaches
Pittsburgh Steelers players
Players of American football from Washington, D.C.
Burials at Arlington National Cemetery